Flo Mounier (born 29 June 1974 in Tours, France) is the drummer of the metal band Cryptopsy.

He has toured Canada, Europe, Japan, Australia and the United States as a headlining act over the last 24 years, and combined record sales have reached over 300,000 copies to date.

He is highly recognized within the metal scene, not only as a member of Cryptopsy, but also as a professional drummer and clinician. He is sponsored by Pearl Drums, Sabian, Vic Firth, Evans Drumheads, Shure (Canada)  and Billdidit.

Along with his longtime stint in Cryptopsy, Mounier has contributed to other metal projects, including collaborations with Egyptian-American songwriter Nader Sadek, as well as death metal supergroup VLTIMAS, alongside former Morbid Angel frontman and bassist David Vincent and former Mayhem guitarist Blasphemer.

References

External links
 http://cryptopsy.ca/the-band/
 https://web.archive.org/web/20150113050032/http://www.drummagazine.com/features/post/flo-mounier-you-shall-know-his-velocity

Living people
Canadian heavy metal drummers
Death metal musicians
Canadian male drummers
Place of birth missing (living people)
20th-century Canadian drummers
21st-century Canadian drummers
20th-century Canadian male musicians
21st-century Canadian male musicians
1974 births